Lysobacter arseniciresistens is a Gram-positive, rod-shaped, aerobic, arsenite-resistant and motile bacterium from the genus of Lysobacter which has been isolated from soil from an iron mine in Daye in China.

References

Bacteria described in 2012
Xanthomonadales